Bruce Adams Sloan (October 4, 1914 – September 24, 1973), nicknamed "Fatso", was a  Major League Baseball player who played for the New York Giants in . He was primarily used as a pinch hitter, but was also used as a right fielder.

External links

1914 births
1973 deaths
New York Giants (NL) players
Baseball players from Oklahoma
Oklahoma City Stars baseball players